Francisco Benjamín López Toledo (17 July 1940 – 5 September 2019) was a Mexican Zapotec painter, sculptor, and graphic artist. In a career that spanned seven decades, Toledo produced thousands of works of art and became widely regarded as one of Mexico's most important contemporary artists. An activist as well as an artist, he promoted the artistic culture and heritage of Oaxaca state. Toledo was considered part of the Breakaway Generation of Mexican art.

Early life and education 
Toledo was born in Mexico City in 1940, the child of Francisco López Orozco and Florencia Toledo Nolasco. He studied at the Escuela de Bellas Artes de Oaxaca and the Centro Superior de Artes Applicadas del Instituto Nacional de Bellas Artes, Mexico, where he studied graphic arts with Guillermo Silva Santamaria. As a young man, Toledo studied art in Paris where he met Rufino Tamayo and Octavio Paz.

Career 

Toledo worked in various media, including pottery, sculpture, weaving, graphic arts, and painting. There have been exhibitions of his work in Argentina, Brazil, Colombia, Ecuador, Spain, the United Kingdom, Belgium, France, Japan, Sweden, the United States, as well as other countries. His work is known for its portrayal of flora and fauna, mythical imagery, and erotic content. Art critic Dore Ashton characterized Toledo as "a modern artist who, like others such as Paul Klee, Marc Chagall and Miró, has learned the value of the sweeping glance into the minutest corners of nature."

At the age of 19, a solo exhibition of his work in Fort Worth, Texas, received international attention. Toledo lived and worked in Paris starting in 1960 and returned to Mexico in 1965. He lived briefly in New York in the late 1970s, holding an exhibition at the Everson Museum of Art in Syracuse, New York. In 1980, Mexico City's Museo de Arte Moderno hosted a retrospective of his art. His work was shown at both the Museo del Palacio de Bellas Artes in Mexico City and the Mexican Fine Arts Center Museum of Chicago in 1984. Toledo settled in Oaxaca in the 1980s.

Toledo was featured at the Venice Biennale in 1997. An exhibition of over 90 of his works was shown at the Whitechapel Gallery in London and the Reina Sofia Museum in Madrid in 2000. In 2017, the Fondo Cultural Banamex published a four-volume catalogue of Toledo's work, the result of a five-year investigation to track pieces held in museums, galleries, and private collections around the world.

Art activism 

Toledo's social and cultural concerns about his home state led to his participation in the establishment of an art library at the Instituto de Artes Gráficas de Oaxaca (IAGO), as well as his involvement in the founding of the :es:Museo de Arte Contemporáneo de Oaxaca (MACO), the Patronato Pro-Defensa y Conservación del Patrimonio Cultural de Oaxaca, a library for the blind, a photographic center, and the Eduardo Mata Music Library. A cultural conservationist, Toledo fought against the building of a McDonald's in Oaxaca City and led protests to stop the construction of a convention center on a local mountain.

Following the 2014 disappearance of 43 students in Iguala, Guerrero, Toledo made an exhibition of kites to remember the students, honoring a tradition from Oaxaca. The exhibition was titled Duelo (Mourning), at the Museo de Arte Moderno, Mexico City, and Fire and Earth at Latin American Masters, Los Angeles.

Awards 
Mexican National Prize for Arts and Sciences (Premio Nacional de Ciencias y Artes) (1998)
Prince Claus Award, Prince Claus Fund (2000)
Federico Sescosse Prize, ICOMOS Mexico (2003)
Right Livelihood Award (2005)

Personal life 
Toledo's parents were Zapotec. He married three times, secondly to poet and translator Elisa Ramirez Castañeda and thirdly to Danish weaver Trine Ellitsgaard. He was father of poet Natalia Toledo and artists Laureana Toledo and Dr Lakra.

Francisco Toledo died on 5 September 2019 at the age of 79.

Tribute 
On 17 July 2021, Google celebrated his 81st birthday with a Google Doodle.

References

External links 
Biography on Estate of Francisco Toledo
Biography on Aquí Oaxaca
Biography on Widewalls
Essay by Dore Ashton
Feature on Smithsonian Magazine by Paul Theroux

1940 births
2019 deaths
Mexican artists
Mexican graphic designers
Latin American artists of indigenous descent
Indigenous Mexican artists
Zapotec people
People from Juchitán de Zaragoza
20th-century Native Americans
21st-century Native Americans